Euryproctus is a genus of wasps belonging to the family Ichneumonidae.

The genus was first described by Holmgren in 1855.

The genus has cosmopolitan distribution.

Species:
 Euryproctus geniculosus
 Euryproctus regenerator

References

Ichneumonidae